Szentkirály is a  village in Bács-Kiskun county, in the Southern Great Plain region of southern Hungary. The name, literally "Saint King," refers to King (later saint) Stephen I of Hungary.

Geography

Natural water in Szentkirály
High quality natural water in Hungary. The natural water from Szentkirály is a family company which began in 1989 in Szentkirály, Hungary. The company initially began as a soft drink company, but when the exceptional purity of the mineral water was discovered, the company began to sell the mineral water on its own merit.

Szentkirály Ásványvíz Kft. was registered as its own company in 2003.

The company Szentkirály currently manufactures a variety of mineral water products in an assortment of sizes, mineral content, and sparkling/still. Their three basic mineral waters are:
 Still, packaged in pink
 Sparkling, packaged in blue
 Mild, packaged in green

References

Populated places in Bács-Kiskun County